Duvar may refer to:

 Turkish for wall
Duvar (film)
Gazete Duvar